The women's individual kata competition at the 2019 European Games in Minsk was held on 29 June 2019 at the Čyžoŭka-Arena.

Schedule
All times are local (UTC+3).

Results

Elimination round

Group A

Group B

Ranking round

Group A

Group B

Bronze medal match

Gold medal match

References

External links
Elimination Round – Group A
Elimination Round – Group A
Ranking Round – Group A
Ranking Round – Group B

Women's kata
European Games